Hipólito Antonio Pichardo Balbina (born August 22, 1969) is a Dominican former right-handed pitcher in Major League Baseball who played for three teams between  and . He batted and threw right-handed.

Pichardo filled various pitching roles, as a starter or coming out from the bullpen as a closer or a middle reliever. He reached the majors in 1992 with the Kansas City Royals, spending seven consecutive years with them before moving to the Boston Red Sox (2000–01) and Houston Astros (2002). He enjoyed a fine rookie season, when he finished with a record of 9–6 and a 3.95 earned run average in 24 starts, including a one-hit shutout against the Boston Red Sox as Luis Rivera's double in the sixth inning was the only hit surrendered.

In 1993, Pichardo went 7–8 and posted career highs in strikeouts (74) and innings pitched (165). After that, he suffered arm problems and was demoted to the bullpen. In 1999 he underwent right elbow surgery and missed the entire season. He returned in 2000 with the Red Sox and went 6–3 with one start and one save in 38 appearances. After going 2–1 in 2001, he lasted only one-third of an inning with Houston in 2002, his last major league season.

In a 10-season career, Pichardo posted a 50–44 record with a 4.44 ERA and 20 saves in 350 games, including 68 starts.

See also

Players from Dominican Republic in MLB

References

External links

BaseballLibrary
Retrosheet

1969 births
Living people
Águilas Cibaeñas players
Boston Red Sox players
Dominican Republic expatriate baseball players in the United States
Houston Astros players
Kansas City Royals players
Major League Baseball pitchers
Major League Baseball players from the Dominican Republic
Appleton Foxes players
Baseball City Royals players
Gulf Coast Braves players
Memphis Chicks players
New Orleans Zephyrs players
Omaha Royals players
Pawtucket Red Sox players
Saraperos de Saltillo players
Sarasota Red Sox players
Dominican Republic expatriate baseball players in Mexico